Amber Corwin Farrow (born December 21, 1978) is an American former competitive figure skater. She is the 1999 Four Continents silver medalist and 2004 bronze medalist.

Personal life 
Corwin was born on December 21, 1978, in Harbor City, California. In December 2004, she completed her degree in fashion merchandising and marketing from Cal State Long Beach. She is married to Franklin Farrow, with whom she has a daughter, Vienna.

Career 
Corwin started skating at the age of five. Making her Champions Series (Grand Prix) debut, she placed 10th at the 1996 NHK Trophy. At the 1997 U.S. Championships, she became the first U.S. woman to land a triple-triple combination in the short program. During her career she attempted to learn the quadruple toe loop jump in hopes of becoming the first woman to land one in competition.

During the 1997–98 ISU Junior Series, Corwin was awarded gold in Germany and silver in Slovakia. She qualified to the ISU Junior Series Final, where she won the silver medal. She won silver at the 1999 Four Continents Championships.

After finishing fourth at the 2004 U.S. Championships, she won the bronze medal at the 2004 Four Continents Championships.

Corwin was represented by Michael Collins Enterprises. She retired from competitive skating in March 2006 to focus on a career in the fashion industry. She designed many of her skating costumes.

Programs

Results
GP: Champions Series / Grand Prix; JGP: Junior Series / Junior Grand Prix

See also
List of select Jewish figure skaters

References

External links 

 

1978 births
American female single skaters
California State University, Long Beach alumni
Jewish American sportspeople
Living people
Figure skaters from Los Angeles
Four Continents Figure Skating Championships medalists
People from Harbor City, Los Angeles
21st-century American Jews
21st-century American women